Joe Dinicol (born December 22, 1983) is a Canadian actor. He is known for his portrayal of Rory Regan / Ragman in a recurring role in the fifth season of Arrow.

Life and career
Dinicol was born in Stratford, Ontario, the son of Emma (née Neville) and acting coach and actor Keith Dinicol. His maternal grandfather was English actor John Neville. He started his career as a child actor at the Stratford Shakespeare Festival, and has since appeared on the Canadian television series Train 48 and Rideau Hall.

On stage, Dinicol has appeared in Antony and Cleopatra, The Merry Wives of Windsor, Waiting for Godot, and Richard III at the Stratford Festival, and The Needfire at the Royal Alexandra Theatre in Toronto. He also performed in the 1996 recording of Waiting for Godot for the Canadian Broadcasting Corporation. His most recent performance was as the second male lead in Paul Gross's Passchendaele released in 2008. Dinicol was the lead of the Amazon-produced series Betas.

Filmography

Film

Television

References

External links
 
 Joe Dinicol biography at Film Reference

1983 births
20th-century Canadian male actors
21st-century Canadian male actors
Canadian male child actors
Canadian male film actors
Canadian male stage actors
Canadian male television actors
Canadian male voice actors
Living people
Male actors from Ontario
Canadian male Shakespearean actors
People from Stratford, Ontario